S-mode #3 is the third single compilation album by Masami Okui, released on 23 February 2005.

Information
This album includes all songs from her singles that were released in May 1999 (19th single) until November 2003 (32nd single) under King Records label.
There is a bonus track in disc 2, Okui's self-cover of Transmigration, a song she made for Nana Mizuki.

Track listing

Disc 1

 Anime television series Starship Girl Yamamoto Yohko opening song
 Lyrics: Masami Okui
 Composition, arrangement: Toshiro Yabuki
Labyrinth
 Movie anime Cyber Team in Akihabara image song
 Lyrics: Masami Okui
 Composition, arrangement: Toshiro Yabuki

 Movie anime Shōjo Kakumei Utena soundtrack
 Lyrics: Masami Okui
 Composition, arrangement: Toshiro Yabuki

 Lyrics: Masami Okui
 Composition, arrangement: Toshiro Yabuki
Only One, No. 1
 Anime television series Di Gi Charat opening song
 Lyrics: Masami Okui
 Composition, arrangement: Toshiro Yabuki
Over the End
 Lyrics: Masami Okui
 Composition, arrangement: Toshiro Yabuki
Turning Point
 Lyrics: Masami Okui
 Composition, arrangement: Toshiro Yabuki
Cutie
 Anime television series Di Gi Charat Summer Special 2000 opening song
 Lyrics: Masami Okui
 Composition, arrangement: Toshiro Yabuki
Just do it
 Lyrics: Masami Okui
 Composition, arrangement: Toshiro Yabuki

 Anime television series Tales of Eternia opening song
 Lyrics, composition: Masami Okui
 Arrangement: Toshiro Yabuki

 Anime television series Di Gi Charat Christmas Special, Ohanami Special, Natsuyasumi Special opening song
 Lyrics: Masami Okui
 Composition, arrangement: Toshiro Yabuki
Shuffle
 Anime television series Yu-Gi-Oh! Duel Monsters opening song
 Lyrics: Masami Okui
 Composition, arrangement: Toshiro Yabuki
DEPORTATION -but, never too late-
 Lyrics, composition: Masami Okui
 Arrangement: Topbeam
HAPPY PLACE
 Lyrics, composition: Masami Okui
 Arrangement: Dry
Second Impact
 Lyrics, composition: Masami Okui
 Arrangement: Toshiro Yabuki

Disc 2

 Anime television series Starship Girl Yamamoto Yohko ending song
 Lyrics, composition: Masami Okui
 Arrangement: Toshiro Yabuki
eternal promise [Deck version]
 Lyrics: Masami Okui
 Composition: Masami Okui, Toshiro Yabuki
 Arrangement: Hideki Satou
Moon
 Lyrics, composition: Masami Okui
 Arrangement: Hideki Satou
Chaos
 Lyrics, composition: Masami Okui
 Arrangement: Hideki Satou
I'd love you to touch me
 Anime television series Tales of Eternia ending song
 Lyrics, composition: Masami Okui
 Arrangement: System-B

 Anime television series Yu-Gi-Oh! Duel Monsters ending song
 Lyrics: Masami Okui
 Composition, arrangement: Toshiro Yabuki

 Lyrics, composition: Masami Okui
 Arrangement: Yuugo Maeda

 Lyrics, composition: Masami Okui
 Arrangement: Yamachi
Pure
 Lyrics: Masami Okui
 Composition: Naozumi Takahashi
 Arrangement: Tsutomu Ohira
Message
 Lyrics: Masami Okui
 Composition, arrangement: Monta
Transmigration
 Lyrics: Masami Okui
 Composition, arrangement: Toshiro Yabuki
 Originally sung by Nana Mizuki

Sources
Official website: Makusonia

2005 compilation albums
Masami Okui albums